Salima Solar Power Station, is a  solar power plant, in Malawi, in Southern Africa. The power station was constructed between December 2018 and November 2021.

Location
The power station is located here.

Overview
As of 2018, Malawi was reported to have the lowest electrification rate in the World, with a per capital consumption estimated at 93 kWh per year compared with an average of 432 kWh for Sub-Saharan Africa and 2,167 kWh per year for the World average. There is urgency for Malawi to reach the critical threshold of 500 kWh per year.

As part of efforts to increase electricity output and to diversify Malawi's sources of energy, the country developed this solar power station (60 megawatts), Kammwamba Thermal Power Station (300 megawatts) and Mpatamanga Hydroelectric Power Station (350 megawatts), in the medium term.

The energy generated by this power station is sold to the Electricity Supply Commission of Malawi (Escom), under a 20-year power purchase agreement.

In addition to the solar farm, a new 132kV electricity switchyard and a new  132kV high voltage transmission line were built to evacuate the generated energy to the Escom 132kV substation at Nanjoka, where it enters the national grid.

Developers
The power station was developed by a consortium comprising three companies as illustrated in the table below:

JCM Power is a Canadian renewable energy, independent power producer, active in South Asia, Latin America and Sub-Saharan Africa.

Construction timeline, costs and funding
Construction was flagged off in December 2018. The development costs of the power station and related infrastructure is quoted as high as US$80 million.

In July 2021, the Africa Trade Insurance Agency (ATI) insured 
JCM Matswani Solar Corporation Limited, the special purpose vehicle company (SPVC) that owns, built, operates and maintains the power station against late payments by the power plant off-taker, Electricity Supply Corporation of Malawi (Escom). The ten-year policy cost US$4.4 million. Completion and commercial commissioning is expected in August 2021.

This renewable energy power project benefitted from partial funding from the Netherlands Entrepreneurial Development Bank (FMO  Netherlands), totaling US$12.51 million.

Commercial commissioning
The completed solar farm was commissioned by Lazarus Chakwera, the President of Malawi, on 19 November 2021.

See also
List of power stations in Malawi

Notes

References

External links
 Malawi's Government Has Launched The Construction Of 60 Megawatts Solar Plant As It Seeks Solutions To Its Power Problems

Solar power stations in Malawi
2021 establishments in Malawi
Energy infrastructure completed in 2021
Renewable energy power stations in Malawi